Kiran Kumar Limbu, also known as Kiran Chemjong  (born 24 March 1990), is a Nepalese professional footballer who plays as a goalkeeper for I-League club RoundGlass Punjab and captains the Nepal national team.

Club career
Born in Dhankuta, Chemjong graduated from the ANFA Academy and joined the Machhindra Football Club. After spending one year at the club Chemjong's impressive performances earned him a move to the Three Star Club in 2007. He has won British Gurkha Cup and Aaha Gold Cup Football Tournament. After being the best goalkeeper of south Asia of the time, Kiran was offered by TC Sports Club in January 2017. He played his first game for TC Sports Club in February 2017 and showed impressive performance, helping the club to win the match by 1–0.

Minerva Punjab
On January 23, 2018, he signed a deal with Hero I League club, Minerva Punjab F.C. for an undisclosed amount. He made his debut for the club in an away fixture against NEROCA. He saved a penalty in the 50th minute against East Bengal, which was taken by Katsumi Yusa. He was adjudged as the hero-of-the-match for that fine save. Kiran made total of 8 appearances for the club. He eventually won the 2017–18 I-League with Minerva.

RoundGlass Punjab
In September 2022, he signed for I-League club RoundGlass Punjab. He was part of the team that clinched their second I-League trophy in 2022–23 season, and gained promotion to 2023–24 Indian Super League.

International career
He is currently considered as the first choice goalkeeper in Nepal. He has a height advantage over more senior keepers like Bikash Malla and Ritesh Thapa. He has produced brilliant displays against oppositions bringing wide acclaims. Chemjong played debut match for Nepal in 2008 AFC Challenge Cup qualifiers held in Phnom Penh, Cambodia, although he broke his jaw in the match. He debuted at the home ground against Afghanistan.

In the 2012 Nehru Cup, Chemjong won the man of the match award in Nepal's game with India. His performance in the match earned praise from the Indian newspaper The Hindu and from the Maldives head coach István Urbányi.

Personal life
In 2015, along with Three Star teammate Bishnu Gurung, Chemjong paid a visit to malnourished children in an orphanage in Pokhara, saying afterwards that it was a "day to remember". On 31 August 2022, He married with his long time girlfriend Kanchan Niraula.

Club honours
Minerva Punjab/RoundGlass Punjab
I-League: 2017–18, 2022–23

TC Sports
Dhivehi Premier League: 2018

Maziya S&RC
Dhivehi Premier League: 2022

Individual
Dhivehi Premier League Best Goalkeeper: 2018
I-League Best Goalkeeper: 2019–20, 2022–23
Nepal Super League Best Goalkeeper: 2021

References

External links 

1990 births
Living people
People from Dhankuta
Nepalese footballers
Nepal international footballers
Three Star Club players
Nepalese expatriate footballers
Expatriate footballers in the Maldives
Nepalese expatriate sportspeople in the Maldives
Expatriate footballers in India
Nepalese expatriate sportspeople in India
machhindra F.C. players
Manang Marshyangdi Club players
RoundGlass Punjab FC players
Maziya S&RC players
I-League players
Association football goalkeepers
Limbu people
Footballers at the 2018 Asian Games
Asian Games competitors for Nepal
T.C. Sports Club players